Access All Areas may refer to:

Access All Areas (Spyro Gyra album), 1984
Access All Areas (Eric Burdon & Brian Auger Band album), 1993
Access All Areas (Anna Vissi album), 2012
Access All Areas (EP), 2017 extended play by the AAA Girls
"The Simpsons: Access All Areas", a Simpsons special featuring behind the scenes footage
Access All Areas: Remixed and B-Sides, an album by Atomic Kitten
Access All Areas: A Rock & Roll Odyssey, a documentary following rock band Bon Jovi 
Access All Areas (TV series), a British television reality series